Anton Cargnelli (1 February 1889 – 27 June 1974) most commonly known as Tony Cargnelli, was an Austrian football player and manager from Vienna.

Very little is known about his time as a player, he is most famous for managing several top clubs in Italian football.

References

External links 
 
 
 

1889 births
Footballers from Vienna
Austrian footballers
Austria international footballers
Austrian football managers
Austrian people of Italian descent
Torino F.C. managers
Palermo F.C. managers
Calcio Foggia 1920 managers
S.S.C. Bari managers
Inter Milan managers
A.C. Cuneo 1905 managers
S.S. Lazio managers
S.S.D. Lucchese 1905 managers
Bologna F.C. 1909 managers
U.S. Alessandria Calcio 1912 managers
1974 deaths
Association football forwards
SV Schwechat players
Wiener AF players
Austrian expatriate football managers
Expatriate football managers in Italy